Mt. Zion Methodist Church is a historic United Methodist church building at 500 High Street in Brenham, Texas.

The Gothic Revival building was constructed in 1921 and added to the National Register of Historic Places in 1990.

See also

National Register of Historic Places listings in Washington County, Texas

References

United Methodist churches in Texas
Churches on the National Register of Historic Places in Texas
National Register of Historic Places in Washington County, Texas
Carpenter Gothic church buildings in Texas
Churches completed in 1921
20th-century Methodist church buildings in the United States
Churches in Washington County, Texas
Buildings and structures in Brenham, Texas